HMS Swale (K217) was a  of the Royal Navy (RN) from 1942 to 1955, loaned to the South African Navy for six months at the end of the Second World War.

Construction
Swale was built to the RN's specifications as a Group I River-class frigate. She was laid down at Smiths Dock Co., South Bank-on-Tees on 19 August 1941 and launched on 16 January 1942. The ship was commissioned into the RN on 24 June 1942 as K 217 and named for the River Swale in Yorkshire, England.

War service

Early days
Swale saw extensive service on convoy escort missions and experienced some of the worst days of the Battle of the Atlantic. In March 1943 she was SO (Senior Officer's ship) of the Escort Group (EG) B5, escorting the slow convoy SC 122 from New York to Liverpool. Of the 51 merchant ships in the convoy, 10 returned to port unable to ride a violent storm; three days later another eight were sunk by U-boats.

Swale was to have better fortunes two months later. The U-boat had earlier torpedoed the  steamer Aymeric, the last British cargo ship in the Atlantic to be sunk that month, claiming the lives of 53 men. Under the command of Lieutenant Commander John Jackson, DSC, RNR, Swale moved  astern of the doomed Aymeric and made ASDIC (sonar) contact. After a succession of depth charge and Hedgehog attacks, she was rewarded with the sound of several loud explosions and the appearance of burning oil on the surface. The convoy continued to Canada without further loss.

Convoy Faith episode
On 10 July 1943 Swale sailed Gibraltar to rendezvous with the small, fast Convoy Faith (one of the 'Winston Specials') en route from Greenock in Scotland to Freetown, Sierra Leone. By the time Swale arrived at 2235 hrs, both California and Duchess of York had been hit, set on fire, and abandoned, to be sunk later by torpedoes from their escorts. Swale too was attacked by the Condors, bombs falling just  astern. After making an A/S sweep, Swale was ordered to escort Port Fairy, which had escaped unscathed, to Casablanca, ahead of the other escorts which were still searching for survivors. On the evening of the next day, the two ships were attacked by two Fw 200s returning from a reconnaissance mission off the Portuguese coast. Despite the interception and strafing of the Condors by two US Navy PBY Catalinas  Port Fairy was hit on her port quarter by a  bomb which started a fire next to her magazine. Swale came alongside, took off 64 survivors from the two troopships together with eight passengers, and helped extinguish the blaze with her hoses. Port Fairy was repaired at Casablanca and remained in service until 1965.

Last success
On 6 April 1944, while escorting the slow convoy SC 156 from Halifax, Canada to Loch Ewe, Scotland, Swale sank    with depth charges northwest of the Azores after the U-boat penetrated the escort screen and sank the Norwegian merchantmen  Ruth 1  and South America.

Post-war service
Swale was loaned to the South African Navy on 26 June 1945 as  but returned to the RN in January 1946. She was scrapped on 26 February 1955.

References

External links
 Comprehensive details of the Atlantic convoys and their fates.

 

1942 ships
River-class frigates of the Royal Navy